Lyclene kepica is a moth of the family Erebidae. It was described by Vladimir Viktorovitch Dubatolov and Karol Bucsek in 2013. It is found in Cambodia.

References

Nudariina
Moths described in 2013
Moths of Asia